Carbrooke is a village and civil parish in the Breckland district of Norfolk, England. In the 2011 Census, Carbrooke had a population of 2,073 people in 835 households.

History
Carbrooke's name is of Anglo-Saxon and Viking origin and derives from an amalgamation of the Old Norse word for an abundance of brambles and the Old English for a brook or stream.

In the Domesday Book, Carbrooke is listed as a settlement of 62 households in the hundred of Wayland. The village was divided in ownership between Ralph de Tosny and John fitzRichard.

Amenities
Millenium Green is a playing ground of over 10 acres and is run in the interest of the village by a board of Trustees. The annual, Carbrooke Village Fete is held on the green.

The majority of local children attend St. Peter & St. Paul Church of England Primary School which was rated 'Good' by Ofsted in 2019.

St. Peter & St. Paul's Church
Carbrooke's Parish Church is of Norman origin and is dedicated in honour of Saint Peter and Saint Paul. The church was significantly remodelled in the Fourteenth and Nineteenth Century, with stained glass being installed by James Powell and Sons. The radical socialist minister, George B. Chambers was incumbent in the church from 1927 to 1955 who procured many pieces of art from John Moray-Smith for the church.

Notable Residents
George B. Chambers- English priest, social activist and author
Edward Dewing- English cricketer and antiquarian

War Memorial
Carbrooke's War Memorial takes the form of a stone cross in St. Peter & St. Paul's Churchyard. It lists the following names of the fallen for the First World War:
 Sergeant William R. Williamson (1886-1918), 1st Battalion, Royal Norfolk Regiment
 Lance-Sergeant Herbert Wyer (1883-1914), 3rd Battalion, Coldstream Guards
 Lance-Sergeant Walter Leveridge (d.1915), 2nd Battalion, Royal Norfolk Regiment
 Lance-Corporal Bertie Leveridge (d.1917), 1st Battalion, Royal Norfolk Regiment
 Driver Walter H. Smith (d.1917), 209th (Field) Company, Royal Engineers
 Private Sidney Green (d.1918), 4th Battalion, Bedfordshire Regiment
 Private Frederick W. Watson (1896-1916), 12th Battalion, East Yorkshire Regiment
 Private William Ainger (1888-1919), 6th Battalion, Leicestershire Regiment
 Private Frederick J. Williamson (1898-1918), 35th Company, Machine Gun Corps
 Private Arthur D. Greaves (d.1917), 23rd Battalion, Middlesex Regiment
 Private Gilbert W. Murrell (d.1916), 1st Battalion, Royal Norfolk Regiment
 Private Robert D. Murrell (d.1916), 1st Battalion, Royal Norfolk Regiment
 Private Ernest F. M. Back (d.1916), 1st Battalion, Royal Norfolk Regiment
 Private William G. Harrod (1898-1917), 3rd Battalion, Royal Norfolk Regiment
 Private Herbert Abbey (d.1918), 7th Battalion, Royal Norfolk Regiment
 Private Frederick J. Beets (1895-1916), 7th Battalion, Royal Norfolk Regiment
 Private Victor E. Johnson (1898-1915), 10th Battalion, Royal Norfolk Regiment
 Private Wilfred J. Bullen (1896-1918), Norfolk Yeomanry
 Private Arthur C. Murrell (d.1918), 1st Battalion, Queen's Royal Regiment (West Surrey)
 Private Robert J. Tolman (d.1918), 2/6th Battalion, North Staffordshire Regiment
 Private Sidney Sutton (d.1916), 2nd Battalion, Royal Sussex Regiment

And, the following for the Second World War:
 Sergeant William K. Ambrose (1912-1943), No. 47 Squadron RAF
 Sergeant Alan D. Johnstone (d.1943), No. 78 Squadron RAF
 Flight-Sergeant Hedley A. Goldsmith (1917-1942), No. 217 Squadron RAF
 Sergeant Arthur W. Fincham (1924-1943), No. 218 (Gold Coast) Squadron RAF
 Private Roland L. Marler (1916-1942), 6th Battalion, Royal Norfolk Regiment
 Private Harry J. Ruffles (1913-1944), 7th Battalion, Royal Norfolk Regiment

References

External links

Villages in Norfolk
Breckland District
Civil parishes in Norfolk